Roy Stevenson (born c. 1933) was a Canadian football player who played for the Edmonton Eskimos. He won the Grey Cup with the Eskimos in 1955 and 1956. Born in Chatham, Ontario, he previously attended the University of Toronto, where he played on the football team. He also played for the Kitchener-Waterloo Dutchmen.

References

1930s births
Living people
Toronto Varsity Blues football players
Edmonton Elks players
Sportspeople from Chatham-Kent
Players of Canadian football from Ontario